40.14.4 is the second studio album by Swedish singer Jessica Andersson. The album was released in October 2013 and peaked at number six on the Swedish Albums Chart.

Background and release
In 2003, Andersson, represented Sweden in the Eurovision Song Contest 2003 as part of Fame, coming fifth. In 2004, Andersson decided to pursue a career as a solo artist and has been successful as a singer, winning Let's Dance 2011 and released a biography which has sold over 120,000 copies. In 2012, Andersson signed with BMG Chrysalis and began writing the album. Andersson sings about her tough childhood and the traumas from that time.
Andersson said 40.14.4 is different from what she has done before, with the music and lyrics being closer to what she likes to listen to; referencing artists like Lars Winnerbäck, Melissa Horn and Peter LeMarc. It is the first record she has written herself.

Track listing

Charts

Release history

References

2013 albums
Jessica Andersson albums